Estigmene ansorgei is a moth of the  family Erebidae. It was described by Rothschild in 1910. It is found in Burundi, the Democratic Republic of Congo, Kenya, Rwanda, Tanzania, Uganda and Zambia.

References

 Natural History Museum Lepidoptera generic names catalog

Spilosomina
Moths described in 1910
Insects of Tanzania
Fauna of Zambia
Moths of Africa